Jan May  (born 11 June 1995 in Landau) is a German male track cyclist, representing Germany at international competitions. He won the bronze medal at the 2016 UEC European Track Championships in the team sprint.

References

1995 births
Living people
German male cyclists
German track cyclists
Place of birth missing (living people)
People from Landau
Cyclists from Rhineland-Palatinate